Bermuda, Islands of Bermuda, or The Somers Isles is an Atlantic archipelago, British Overseas Territory, and a former part of Virginia.

Bermuda may also refer to:

Places

United States 
Thousands of Bermudians emigrated to North America in the seventeenth and eighteenth centuries, especially to the South-East. These émigrés left the name of the archipelago in many parts of the modern United States of America.

Alabama
Bermuda, Alabama, a populated (community) place in Conecuh County
Bermuda Hill, a historic plantation house near Prairieville.

Arizona
Bermuda Falls Spring, a spring in Gila County

California
Bermuda Dunes, a census-designated place in Riverside County

Connecticut
Bermuda Lagoon, a lake in Fairfield County

Georgia
Bermuda, Calhoun County, Georgia, a populated place in Calhoun County
Bermuda, DeKalb County, Georgia, a populated place in DeKalb County
Bermuda Hill (Georgia), a 984 feet/300 metre summit in Catoosa County
Bermuda Island, Georgia, an island in Liberty County, also known as Colonels Island, and Heron Island (the Atlantic archipelago also had an alternate name of La Garza – Spanish for 'the Heron')

Louisiana
Bermuda, Louisiana, an unincorporated community in Natchitoches Parish
Bermuda Plantation, a former cotton plantation (previously called Ile Breville), belonging to the Prudhomme family, and a current locale, in Natchitoches Parish

Maine
Little Bermuda, an island in Waldo County

Mississippi
Bermuda Landing, an historical locale in Humphreys County

North Carolina
Bermuda Run, North Carolina, the newest incorporated municipality in Davie County
Bermuda Island, in Albemarle Sound

Pennsylvania
Bermuda Springs

Rhode Island
Block Island, advertised as the Bermuda of the North

South Carolina
Bermuda Bluff, a cliff in Beaufort County
Bermuda Creek, a stream in Charleston County
Town of Bermuda, South Carolina (ca. 1699-1720s)

Texas
Bermuda Beach, a beach on Lake Como, in Galveston County
Bermuda Lake, (and Bermuda Dam) a reservoir in Dimmit County

Virginia
Bermuda District, Virginia, a district of Chesterfield County
Bermuda Hundred, Virginia, the first incorporated town in Virginia
Bermuda Place, Virginia, in Chesterfield County
Hopewell, Virginia, now contains what was Bermuda City and Bermuda Run

Elsewhere 
Bermuda, Warwickshire, a village in England, named to honour a former Governor of the islands of Bermuda
Bermuda Triangle, a region of the Atlantic, roughly between Bermuda, Florida, and the West Indies

People 
Jon "Bermuda" Schwartz (born 1956), a drummer for "Weird Al" Yankovic

Arts, entertainment, and media
"Bermuda" (song), a 1951 song by The Bell Sisters
"Bermuda", a song by Roky Erickson, first released as a single, and then inserted into some albums

Military
Bermuda Hundred Campaign, a campaign during the American Civil War
Brewster SB2A Buccaneer, also known as Brewster Bermuda, a British name for the Brewster SB2A Buccaneer two-seat scout bomber
HMS Bermuda, seven ships of the Royal Navy named after the island
Royal Naval Dockyard, Bermuda, known as HMD Bermuda, the dockyard at the core of the Royal Navy base in Bermuda

Plants
Bermuda Onion, also known as sweet onion, any of several varieties of mild-flavored onions shaped like a flattened sphere
Cynodon dactylon, or Bermuda grass, a fast-growing Mediterranean grass best suited for warm climates
Juniperus bermudiana, a juniper tree endemic to Bermuda, known as Bermuda cedar
Lilium longiflorum, known as the Easter lily, or the Bermuda lily
Sisyrinchium bermudiana, a flowering plant endemic to Bermuda, belonging to the Sisyrinchium genus

Sailing
Bermuda rig, a form of rigging for boats and small ships
Bermuda sloop, a type of sailing vessel originating in the island equipped with gaff or Bermuda rig. Also used for modern sloops with Bermuda rig

Transportation
 45600 Bermuda, a British LMS Jubilee Class locomotive
MV Bermuda, a British cruise ship launched in 1927
Edsel Bermuda, a 1958 station wagon

Other uses
Bermuda Agreement, an aviation agreement between the United States and the United Kingdom
Bermuda Conference, an international conference between the United Kingdom and the United States held on April 19, 1943 at Hamilton, Bermuda, concerned with the plight of European Jews
Bermuda kite, a type of kite traditionally flown in Bermuda at Easter, symbolizing the ascent of Christ
Bermuda national cricket team, the national cricket team of Bermuda
Bermuda shorts, a type of short trousers

See also
Barbuda (disambiguation)
Bermudian (disambiguation)